Mohamed Amine Khamsi (born 1959 in Morocco) is an American/Moroccan mathematician. His research interests include nonlinear functional analysis, the fixed point theory and metric spaces. In particular, he has made notable contributions to the fixed point theory of metric spaces. 
He graduated from the prestigious École Polytechnique in 1983 after attending the equally prestigious Lycée Louis-le-Grand in Paris, France.  He completed his PhD, entitled "La propriété du point fixe dans les espaces de Banach et les espaces Metriques", at the Pierre-and-Marie-Curie University in May 1987 under the supervision of Gilles Godefroy. He then went on to visit University of Southern California and University of Rhode Island from 1987 to 1989. Since 1989 he has worked from the University of Texas at El Paso, as a full professor of mathematics since 1999.

Bibliography

References

External links
 Mohamed A Khamsi's personal webpage at the University of Texas at El Paso
S.O.S. Mathematics
Personal website

20th-century American mathematicians
21st-century American mathematicians
University of Texas at El Paso faculty
École Polytechnique alumni
Living people
American people of Moroccan descent
Moroccan mathematicians
1959 births